Jelenić is a Serbian and Croatian surname. Notable people with the surname include:

Petar Jelenić (born 1987), retired Croatian tennis player
Viktor Jelenić (born 1970), retired Serbian water polo player

See also
 Jelenič

Croatian surnames
Serbian surnames
Patronymic surnames